The Ministry of Transport of the People's Republic of China is an agency responsible for railway, road, air and water transportation regulations in China. It is a constituent department of the State Council.

History 
The MOT's origins date back to 1912 when the Ministry of Transportation and Communications of the Republic of China was established.

In early March 2008, the National People's Congress announced the creation of a combined ministry for road, air and water transport. The Ministry of Communications, Civil Aviation Administration and the State Postal Bureau were merged into the new Ministry of Transportation. This excluded rail transport, which was administered by the Ministry of Railways until its regulatory function passed to the MOT in March 2013.

Several agencies reporting to the Ministry. These include:
 Civil Aviation Administration of China
 State Post Bureau, which regulates China Post
 China Maritime Safety Administration

Former English name 

One predecessor to the current ministry was the Ministry of Communications (MOC). In other countries, a Ministry of Communications is responsible for telecommunications and broadcasting. However, the Chinese MOC supervised road and water transport, with other ministries overseeing telecommunications and broadcasting. This discrepancy was caused by changes in the English language that took place after the Ministry was first created.

One definition of the English word communication is the linking of two points by a means of transport. Roads, railways, and waterways were all considered to be forms of communication. When the Qing Dynasty established the Ministry of Posts and Communications in 1906, the English word communication still carried this meaning. After the People's Republic of China was established, other ministries were created to oversee railways, airlines, postal services, and telecommunications. The remaining transportation functions remained with the Ministry of Communications.

However, the English language moved in the opposite direction. By 1907, communication had begun to acquire a different meaning: a system of transmitting information over a distance. This eventually became the primary meaning of the word communication, while transport and transportation became the preferred terms for the linking of two points. As a result, the Chinese Ministry of Communications ended up with a different set of responsibilities from the Ministry of Communications in other countries.

List of Ministers

See also 
 Ministries of the People's Republic of China
  Ministry of Transportation and Communications, parallel ministry of the Republic of China

References 

 
Transport
China
Ministries established in 1954
1954 establishments in China